St. Kevin's A.I. Higher secondary School, founded in 1905 by the PBVM, is a private, all-girls high school in the Catholic tradition. Located in Chennai, Tamil Nadu, India, the school is a member of the Anglo-Indian Board of Educations association.

Houses 
Anjali House (formerly St. Cecilia) 
 Motto: Praise and Service - 
 Colour Blue
Jeevan House (formerly St. Joseph) – 
 Motto: Faith and Good Deeds - 
 Colour: Green
Prerna House (formerly St. Paul) – 
 Motto: Aspire and Inspire - 
 Colour: pink 
Sneha House (formerly St. Agnes) – 
 Motto: Beauty and Truth - 
 Colour: Red

Notable alumni
 Alisha Abdullah - India's first female racer

References 

 

Presentation Sisters schools
Catholic secondary schools in India
Christian schools in Tamil Nadu
Girls' schools in Tamil Nadu
Primary schools in Tamil Nadu
High schools and secondary schools in Chennai
Educational institutions established in 1905
1905 establishments in India